Garlic bread   (also called garlic toast) consists of bread (usually a baguette, sour dough, or bread such as ciabatta), topped with garlic and olive oil or butter and may include additional herbs, such as oregano or chives. It is then either grilled until toasted or baked in a conventional or bread oven.

It is typically made using a French baguette, or sometimes ciabatta which is partially sliced downwards, allowing the condiments to soak into the loaf while keeping it in one piece. The bread is then stuffed through the cuts with oil and minced garlic before baking. Alternatively, butter and garlic powder are used, or the bread is cut lengthwise into separate slices which are individually garnished.

Some variants are topped with a variety of cheeses, often mozzarella, Parmesan, cheddar or feta. Some restaurants use clarified butter in place of olive oil.

History
Garlic bread stems from bruschetta, which appeared in Italy around the 15th century, and can be traced back to Ancient Rome. Garlic bread originated in the United States and it is a typical Italian-American dish. It probably originated after Italian immigrants started to use butter as a substitute for olive oil, which was uncommon in the United States in the first half of the 20th century.

Europe
Garlic bread can not be found in Italy, as Italian cuisine uses garlic parsimoniously and the bread at the table is usually eaten plain. 

In France, it was common in Provence, where it was called chapon and served with salad. It was also prepared in other regions, such as Quercy, as a crust of bread rubbed with garlic, and spiced with a pinch of salt along with a drop of walnut oil. 

In England, butter is used instead of olive oil in garlic bread.

North America 
In the United States garlic bread has been on the menu of many restaurants since at least the 1950s, often paired with pasta dishes, particularly lasagna and spaghetti. Commercially manufactured frozen garlic bread was developed in the 1970s by Cole's Quality Foods in Muskegon, Michigan.

Cultural references
British comedian Peter Kay famously mentioned the bread in his stand-up routine, quoting his father's disbelief upon hearing of it ("Garlic bread? Garlic bread?"). He subsequently referenced this in his sitcom Phoenix Nights, when nightclub owner Brian Potter (played by Kay) says, "Garlic bread – it’s the future, I’ve tasted it". 

In a 2004 poll by Gold (then UKTV Gold) to find the best British television comedy one-liner, this came top.

Kay's routine gained some revived attention following a stand-up act by an aspiring comedienne named Elaine Williams on series 5 of Britain's Got Talent, whose heavily criticised and ridiculed performance eventually devolved into simply repeating the phrase "garlic bread", in reference to the Peter Kay routine, multiple times. When this was not met with laughter, she told the audience to "fuck off", before walking off stage. A clip of the audition has since gone viral on YouTube, and is associated with numerous internet memes on the subject of garlic bread. 

In the 2005 comic book Scott Pilgrim vs. the World created by Canadian cartoonist Bryan Lee O'Malley, and the 2010 film adaptation of the same name, Scott mentions this as his favorite food: "Garlic bread is my favourite food. I could honestly eat it for every meal. Or just all the time without even stopping".

See also

 Garlic soup
 List of bread dishes
 List of garlic dishes
 List of toast dishes

References

External links

Cooking For Engineers: Parmesan Garlic Bread – a simple recipe with step-by-step photograph
Garlic Bread info

Bread dishes
Italian-American cuisine
Garlic dishes
Toast dishes